José Eduardo Martins may refer to:

 José Eduardo Martins (pianist) – Brazilian concert pianist
 José Eduardo Martins (politician) – Portuguese lawyer and politician